In mathematics, a bundle is a generalization of a fiber bundle dropping the condition of a local product structure. The requirement of a local product structure rests on the bundle having a topology. Without this requirement, more general objects can be considered bundles. For example, one can consider a bundle π: E→ B with E and B sets. It is no longer true that the preimages  must all look alike, unlike fiber bundles where the fibers must all be isomorphic (in the case of vector bundles) and homeomorphic.

Definition 
 is called the total space
 is the base space of the bundle
 is the projection

This definition of a bundle is quite unrestrictive. For instance, the empty function defines a bundle.

A cross section is a map  such that  for each , that is, .

Examples 
Here and in the following examples, the smoothness condition may be weakened to continuous or sharpened to analytic, or it could be anything reasonable, like continuously differentiable, in between.
Usually there is additional structure , e.g. a group structure or a vector space structure, on the fibers besides a topology. Then is required that the homeomorphism is an isomorphism with respect to that structure, and the conditions of local triviality are sharpened accordingly.
A principal bundle is a fiber bundle endowed with a right group action with certain properties. One example of a principal bundle is the frame bundle.
The tangent bundle is an example of a vector bundle.

Bundle objects
More generally, bundles or bundle objects can be defined in any category: in a category C, a bundle is simply an epimorphism π: E → B.  If the category is not concrete, then the notion of a preimage of the map is not necessarily available. Therefore these bundles may have no fibers at all, although for sufficiently well behaved categories they do; for instance, for a category with pullbacks and a terminal object 1 the points of B can be identified with morphisms p:1→B and the fiber of p is obtained as the pullback of p and π. The category of bundles over B is a subcategory of the slice category (C↓B) of objects over B, while the category of bundles without fixed base object is a subcategory of the comma category (C↓C) which is also the functor category C², the category of morphisms in C.

The category of smooth vector bundles is a bundle object over the category of smooth manifolds in Cat, the category of small categories.  The functor taking each manifold to its tangent bundle is an example of a section of this bundle object.

See also
 Fiber bundle
 Fibration
 Fibered manifold

Notes

References

Category theory
Fiber bundles